Betty Corday (born Elizabeth Shay; March 21, 1912 – November 17, 1987) was a Broadway dramatic actress and long-time American television producer. She co-created and executive produced the long running NBC drama Days of Our Lives from 1966 until her death in 1987.

Biography

Stage
Corday had previously been a Broadway stage actress, starring in "one flop after another" before marrying her husband, a Winnipeg-born lawyer. They were married from 1942 until his death in 1966. They had two sons, Chris and Ken.

Radio
Corday produced such radio soaps as Pepper Young's Family and Young Dr. Malone.

Television
Becoming executive producer after the death of her husband, Ted Corday (credited as Mrs. Ted Corday), she was the executive producer of Days of Our Lives from 1966 to 1985. She semi-retired in 1985, turning control over to her son, Ken. She kept the title of executive producer until her death in November 1987. In addition to her work on Days of our Lives, Corday was a consultant for The Young and the Restless.

Death
Betty Corday died at age 75 on November 17, 1987 from respiratory failure at Cedars-Sinai Medical Center, Los Angeles, California.

Executive producing tenure

References

External links 
 
 

1912 births
1987 deaths
American stage actresses
Place of birth missing
Days of Our Lives
Soap opera producers
American women television producers
20th-century American actresses